Ferit Orhan Pamuk (born 7 June 1952) is a Turkish novelist, screenwriter, academic, and recipient of the 2006 Nobel Prize in Literature. One of Turkey's most prominent novelists, his work has sold over thirteen million books in sixty-three languages, making him the country's best-selling writer.

Pamuk is the author of novels including Silent House, The White Castle, The Black Book, The New Life, My Name Is Red, Snow, The Museum of Innocence, A Strangeness in My Mind and The Red-Haired Woman. He is the Robert Yik-Fong Tam Professor in the Humanities at Columbia University, where he teaches writing and comparative literature. He was elected to the American Philosophical Society in 2018.

Of partial Circassian descent and born in Istanbul, Pamuk is the first Turkish Nobel laureate. He is also the recipient of numerous other literary awards. My Name Is Red won the 2002 Prix du Meilleur Livre Étranger, 2002 Premio Grinzane Cavour and 2003 International Dublin Literary Award.

The European Writers' Parliament came about as a result of a joint proposal by Pamuk and José Saramago. Pamuk's willingness to write books about contentious historical and political events put him at risk of censure in his homeland. In 2005, a lawyer sued him over a statement regarding the Armenian genocide in the Ottoman Empire. His intention, according to Pamuk himself, had been to highlight issues relating to freedom of speech in the country of his birth. The court initially declined to hear the case, but in 2011 Pamuk was ordered to pay 6,000 liras in total compensation for having insulted the plaintiffs' honor.

Early life
Pamuk was born in Istanbul, in 1952, and he grew up in a wealthy yet declining upper-class family; an experience he describes in passing in his novels The Black Book and Cevdet Bey and His Sons, as well as more thoroughly in his personal memoir Istanbul: Memories and the City. Pamuk's paternal grandmother was Circassian. He was educated at Robert College secondary school in Istanbul and went on to study architecture at the Istanbul Technical University since it was related to his real dream career, painting. He left the architecture school after three years, however, to become a full-time writer, and graduated from the Institute of Journalism at the University of Istanbul in 1976. From ages 22 to 30, Pamuk lived with his mother, writing his first novel and attempting to find a publisher. He describes himself as a Cultural Muslim who associates the historical and cultural identification with the religion while not believing in a personal connection to God.

Work

He started writing regularly in 1974. His first novel, Karanlık ve Işık (Darkness and Light) was a co-winner of the 1979 Milliyet Press Novel Contest (Mehmet Eroğlu was the other winner). This novel was published with the title Cevdet Bey ve Oğulları (Mr. Cevdet and His Sons) in 1982, and won the Orhan Kemal Novel Prize in 1983. It tells the story of three generations of a wealthy Istanbul family living in Nişantaşı, the district of Istanbul where Pamuk grew up.

Pamuk won a number of critical prizes for his early work, including the 1984 Madarali Novel Prize for his second novel Sessiz Ev (Silent House) and the 1991 Prix de la Découverte Européenne for the French translation of this novel. His historical novel Beyaz Kale (The White Castle), published in Turkish in 1985, won the 1990 Independent Award for Foreign Fiction and extended his reputation abroad. On 19 May 1991, The New York Times Book Review stated, "A new star has risen in the east—Orhan Pamuk." He started experimenting with postmodern techniques in his novels, a change from the strict naturalism of his early works.

Popular success took a bit longer to come to Pamuk, but his 1990 novel Kara Kitap (The Black Book) became one of the most controversial and popular books in Turkish literature, due to its complexity and richness. In 1992, he wrote the screenplay for the movie Gizli Yüz (Secret Face), based on Kara Kitap and directed by a prominent Turkish director, Ömer Kavur. Pamuk's fifth novel Yeni Hayat (New Life) caused a sensation in Turkey upon its 1994 publication and became the fastest-selling book in Turkish history. By this time, Pamuk had also become a high-profile figure in Turkey, due to his support for Kurdish political rights. In 1995, Pamuk was among a group of authors tried for writing essays that criticized Turkey's treatment of the Kurds. In 1999, Pamuk published his book of essays Öteki Renkler (Other Colors).

In 2019, the 66-year-old Nobel Laureate held an exhibition of his photographs of Istanbul taken from his own balcony, named "Balkon: Photos by Orhan Pamuk". The exhibition captured the "subtle and ever-changing view of Istanbul" photographed by Pamuk from his balcony using a telephoto lens. Curated by Gerhard Steidl, the German publisher of his photo book Balkon, the exhibition ran for three months at the Yapı Kredi Culture and Arts building on Istanbul's teeming Istiklal Street. It featured more than 600 colour photos selected from over 8,500 taken by Pamuk over a five-month period in late 2012 and early 2013, in what was described by the gallery as "a period of intense creativity".

My Name Is Red

Pamuk's international reputation continued to increase when he published Benim Adım Kırmızı (My Name is Red) in 1998. The novel blends mystery, romance, and philosophical puzzles in a setting of 16th century Istanbul. It opens a window into the reign of Ottoman Sultan Murat III in nine snowy winter days of 1591, inviting the reader to experience the tension between East and West from a breathlessly urgent perspective. My Name Is Red has been translated into 24 languages and in 2003 won the International Dublin Literary Award, one of the world's most lucrative literary prizes.

Asked what impact winning this last award (currently $127,000) had on his life and work, Pamuk replied:
Nothing changed in my life since I work all the time. I've spent 30 years writing fiction. For the first 10 years, I worried about money and no one asked how much money I made. The second decade I spent money and no one was asking about that. And I've spent the last 10 years with everyone expecting to hear how I spend the money, which I will not do.

Snow

Pamuk followed this with the novel Kar, published in 2002 (English translation: Snow, 2004). Set in the border city of Kars, it explores the conflict between Islamism and Westernism in modern Turkey. Snow follows Ka, an expatriate Turkish poet, as he wanders around the snowy Kars and gets caught up in the muddle of aimless Islamists, MPs, headscarf advocates, secularists, and a number of factions who die and kill in the name of highly contradictory ideals. The New York Times listed Snow as one of its Ten Best Books of 2004.

In conversation with Carol Becker in the Brooklyn Rail about creating sympathetic characters in the political novel, Pamuk said:
I strongly feel that the art of the novel is based on the human capacity, though it’s a limited capacity, to be able to identify with "the other". Only human beings can do this. It requires imagination, a sort of morality, a self-imposed goal of understanding this person who is different from us, which is a rarity.

The Museum of Innocence

In May 2007, Pamuk was among the jury members at the Cannes Film Festival headed by British director Stephen Frears. He completed his next novel, Masumiyet Müzesi (The Museum of Innocence) in the summer of 2008 - the first novel he published after receiving the 2006 Nobel Prize in Literature.

Pamuk created an actual Museum of Innocence, consisting of everyday objects tied to the narrative, and housed them at an Istanbul house he purchased. Pamuk collaborated on a documentary "The Innocence of Memories" that expanded on his Museum of Innocence. Pamuk stated that "(Museum of Dreams will) tell a different version of the love story set in Istanbul through objects and Grant Gee’s wonderful new film". In both Snow and the Museum of Innocence Pamuk describes tragic love-stories, where men fall in love with beautiful women at first sight. Pamuk's heroes tend to be educated men who fall tragically in love with beauties, but who seem doomed to a decrepit loneliness.

In 2013, Pamuk invited Grazia Toderi, whose work he admired, to design a work for the Museum of Innocence in Istanbul. Their collaboration culminated in the exhibition Words and Stars. Words and Stars opened on 2 April 2017, at the MART (Museo di Arte Moderna e Contemporanea di Trento e Rovereto), and which explores "the inclination of man to explore space and innate vocation to question the stars." The show was curated by Gianfranco Maraniello. It also showed from 4 November 2016 to 29 March 2017 from 5–6 November 2016 at the Palazzo Madama, Piazza Castello, Turin, and at Infini-to, the Planetarium of Turin (Infini.to - Planetario di Torino, Museo dell'Astronomia e dello Spazio) by invitation.

The Red-Haired Woman

Pamuk's tenth novel, The Red-Haired Woman (2016) is the story of a well-digger and his apprentice looking for water on barren land. It is also a novel of ideas in the tradition of the French conte philosophique.

In mid-1980s Istanbul, Master Mahmut and his apprentice use ancient methods to dig new wells; this is the tale of their back-breaking struggle, but it is also an exploration—through stories and images—of ideas about fathers and sons, authoritarianism and individuality, state and freedom, reading and seeing. This short, compelling novel is at once a realist text investigating a murder which took place thirty years ago near Istanbul, and a fictional inquiry into the literary foundations of civilizations, comparing two fundamental myths of the West and the East respectively: Sophocles's Oedipus Rex (a story of patricide) and Ferdowsi's tale of Rostam and Sohrab (a story of filicide).

Throughout runs the demonic voice of the eponymous red-haired woman.

Non-fiction
Pamuk published a memoir/travelogue Istanbul—Hatıralar ve Şehir in 2003 (English version, Istanbul—Memories and the City, 2005). Pamuk's Other Colours – a collection of non-fiction and a story — was published in the UK in September 2007.

Asked how personal his book Istanbul: Memories and the City was, Pamuk replied:
I thought I would write Memories and the City in six months, but it took me one year to complete. And I was working twelve hours a day, just reading and working. My life, because of so many things, was in a crisis; I don’t want to go into those details: divorce, father dying, professional problems, problems with this, problems with that, everything was bad. I thought if I were to be weak I would have a depression. But every day I would wake up and have a cold shower and sit down and remember and write, always paying attention to the beauty of the book. Honestly, I may have hurt my mother, my family. My father was dead, but my mother is still alive. But I can’t care about that; I must care about the beauty of the book.

Style
Pamuk's books are characterized by a confusion or loss of identity brought on in part by the conflict between Western and Eastern values. They are often disturbing or unsettling, and include complex plots and characters. His works are also redolent with discussion of and fascination with the creative arts, such as literature and painting. Pamuk's work often touches on the deep-rooted tensions between East and West and tradition and modernism/secularism.

Pamuk speaks about "the angel of inspiration" when he discusses his creativity:

"I am just listening to an inner music, the mystery of which I don't completely know. And I don't want to know."

"I am most surprised by those moments when I have felt as if the sentences, dreams, and pages that have made me so ecstatically happy have not come from my own imagination – that another power has found them and generously presented them to me."

A group of writers assert that some parts of Pamuk's works are heavily influenced by works of other writers, and some chapters are almost totally quoted from other books. Pamuk himself said that his works have been inspired by the writings of rebel poet Kazi Nazrul Islam. One of the writers, nationalist popular-historian Murat Bardakçı, accused him of counterfeiting and plagiarism in the Hurriyet, a Turkish newspaper. Another accusation is that Pamuk's novel The White Castle contains exact paragraphs from Fuad Carim's Kanuni Devrinde İstanbul ("Istanbul in the Time of the Kanuni") novel. After a question raised at the 2009 Boston Book Festival as to whether he wanted to respond to these accusations, Pamuk responded, "No I do not. Next question?". However, many attributed such accusations to their ignorance about postmodern literature, and the literary technique of intertextuality which Pamuk almost always uses in his novels in full disclosure.

Personal life
Pamuk's elder brother Şevket Pamuk, who sometimes appears as a fictional character in Orhan Pamuk's works, is a professor of economics, internationally recognised for his work in economic history of the Ottoman Empire, working at Boğaziçi University in Istanbul. Pamuk also has a younger half-sister Hümeyra Pamuk, who is a journalist.

On 1 March 1982, Pamuk married historian Aylin Türegün. From 1985 to 1988, while his wife was a graduate student at Columbia University, Pamuk assumed the position of visiting scholar there, using the time to conduct research and write his novel The Black Book at the university's Butler Library. This period also included a visiting fellowship at the University of Iowa. Pamuk returned to Istanbul, a city to which he is strongly attached. He and his wife had a daughter named Rüya (born 1991), whose name means "dream" in Turkish, and to whom his seminal novel My Name is Red is dedicated. In 2001, they were divorced.

In 2006, Pamuk returned to the U.S. to take a position as a visiting professor at Columbia, where he was a Fellow with Columbia's Committee on Global Thought and held an appointment in Columbia's Middle East and Asian Languages and Cultures department and at its School of the Arts. In the 2007–2008 academic year Pamuk returned to Columbia to jointly teach comparative literature classes with Andreas Huyssen and David Damrosch. Pamuk was also a writer-in-residence at Bard College. In autumn 2009, Pamuk was Harvard's Charles Eliot Norton Lecturer, delivering a series of lectures entitled "The Naive and Sentimental Novelist".

Orhan publicly acknowledged his relationship with Kiran Desai, Booker prize winner of Indian origin. In January 2011, Turkish-Armenian artist Karolin Fişekçi told Hürriyet Daily News that Pamuk had a two-and-a-half-year relationship with her during the same time (2010–12), a statement expressly denied by Pamuk.

Since 2011 he has been in a relationship with Aslı Akyavaş.

Trial

In 2005, after Pamuk made a statement regarding the Armenian genocide and mass killings of Kurds, a criminal case was opened against the author based on a complaint filed by lawyer Kemal Kerinçsiz. The charges were dropped on 22 January 2006. In Bilecik, his books were burned in a nationalist rally. Pamuk has subsequently stated his intent was to draw attention to freedom of speech issues. However, Kemal Kerinçsiz, the lawyer who had originally pressed charges against Pamuk, appealed to the Supreme Court of Appeal which ordered the court in Şişli to re-open the case. On 27 March 2011, Pamuk was found guilty and ordered to pay 6,000 liras in total compensation to five people for, among others, having insulted their honor.

Pamuk's statements
The criminal charges against Pamuk resulted from remarks he made during an interview in February 2005 with the Swiss publication Das Magazin, a weekly supplement to a number of Swiss daily newspapers: the Tages-Anzeiger, the Basler Zeitung, the Berner Zeitung and the Solothurner Tagblatt. In the interview, Pamuk stated, "Thirty thousand Kurds have been killed here, and a million Armenians. And almost nobody dares to mention that. So I do." Turkish historians were divided over the remarks.

Pamuk stated that he was consequently subjected to a hate campaign that forced him to flee the country. He returned later in 2005, however, to face the charges against him. In an interview with BBC News, he said that he wanted to defend freedom of speech, which was Turkey's only hope for coming to terms with its history: "What happened to the Ottoman Armenians in 1915 was a major thing that was hidden from the Turkish nation; it was a taboo. But we have to be able to talk about the past." However, when Turkish television, CNN TURK asked Pamuk about his speech, he admitted that he said that "Armenians were killed" but he rejected that he said "Turks killed Armenians" and he estimated the number of deaths (as 1 million) in that speech.

Prosecution
At the time, Article 301 of the Turkish Penal Code stated: "A person who publicly insults the Republic or Turkish Grand National Assembly, shall be punishable by imprisonment of between six months to three years." Pamuk was charged with violating this law in the interview. In October, after the prosecution had begun, Pamuk reiterated his views in a speech given during an award ceremony in Germany: "I repeat, I said loud and clear that one million Armenians and 30,000 Kurds were killed in Turkey."

Article 301's old form before 2005 (and also the new form after the amendments in 2008) required that prosecution under the article needs to be approved by the Ministry of Justice. A few minutes after Pamuk's trial started on 16 December, the judge found that this approval had not yet been received and suspended the proceedings. In an interview published in the Akşam newspaper the same day, the then Justice Minister Cemil Çiçek said he had not yet received Pamuk's file but would study it thoroughly once it came.

On 29 December 2005, Turkish state prosecutors dropped the charge that Pamuk insulted Turkey's armed forces, although the charge of "insulting Turkishness" remained.

International reaction
The charges against Pamuk caused an international outcry and led to questions in some circles about Turkey's proposed entry into the European Union. On 30 November, the European Parliament announced that it would send a delegation of five MEPs led by Camiel Eurlings, to observe the trial. EU Enlargement Commissioner Olli Rehn subsequently stated that the Pamuk case would be a "litmus test" of Turkey's commitment to the EU's membership criteria.

On 1 December, Amnesty International released a statement calling for Article 301 to be repealed and for Pamuk and six other people awaiting trial under the act to be freed. PEN American Center also denounced the charges against Pamuk, stating: "PEN finds it extraordinary that a state that has ratified both the United Nations International Covenant on Civil and Political Rights, and the European Convention on Human Rights, both of which see freedom of expression as central, should have a Penal Code that includes a clause that is so clearly contrary to these very same principles."

On 13 December, eight world-renowned authors—José Saramago, Gabriel García Márquez, Günter Grass, Umberto Eco, Carlos Fuentes, Juan Goytisolo, John Updike and Mario Vargas Llosa—issued a joint statement supporting Pamuk and decrying the charges against him as a violation of human rights.

In 2008, in an open online poll, Pamuk was voted as the fourth most intellectual person in the world on the list of Top 100 Public Intellectuals by Prospect Magazine (United Kingdom) and Foreign Policy (United States).

Charges dropped
On 22 January 2006, Turkey's Justice Ministry refused to issue an approval of the prosecution, saying that they had no authority to open a case against Pamuk under the new penal code. With the trial in the local court, it was ruled the next day that the case could not continue without Justice Ministry approval. Pamuk's lawyer, Haluk İnanıcı, subsequently confirmed that charges had been dropped.

The announcement occurred in a week when the EU was scheduled to begin a review of the Turkish justice system.

Interplay
EU enlargement commissioner Olli Rehn welcomed the dropping of charges, saying "This is obviously good news for Mr. Pamuk, but it's also good news for freedom of expression in Turkey". However, some EU representatives expressed disappointment that the justice ministry had rejected the prosecution on a technicality rather than on principle. An Ankara-based EU diplomat reportedly said, "It is good the case has apparently been dropped, but the justice ministry never took a clear position or gave any sign of trying to defend Pamuk". Meanwhile, the lawyer who had led the effort to try Pamuk, Kemal Kerinçsiz, said he would appeal the decision, saying, "Orhan Pamuk must be punished for insulting Turkey and Turkishness, it is a grave crime and it should not be left unpunished."

In 2006, the magazine Time listed Pamuk in the cover article "TIME 100: The People Who Shape Our World", in the category "Heroes & Pioneers", for speaking up.

In April 2006, on the BBC's HARDtalk program, Pamuk stated that his remarks regarding the Armenian genocide were meant to draw attention to freedom of expression issues in Turkey rather than to the massacres themselves.

On 19–20 December 2006, a symposium on Orhan Pamuk and His Work was held at Sabancı University, Istanbul. Pamuk himself gave the closing address.

In January 2008, 13 ultranationalists, including Kemal Kerinçsiz, were arrested by Turkish authorities for participating in a Turkish nationalist underground organisation, named Ergenekon, allegedly conspiring to assassinate political figures, including several Christian missionaries and Armenian intellectual Hrant Dink. Several reports suggest that Pamuk was among the figures this group plotted to kill. The police informed Pamuk about the assassination plans eight months before the Ergenekon investigation.

Awards and honours
 1979 Milliyet Press Novel Contest Award (Turkey) for his novel Karanlık ve Işık (co-winner)
 1983 Orhan Kemal Novel Prize (Turkey) for his novel Cevdet Bey ve Oğulları
 1984 Madarali Novel Prize (Turkey) for his novel Sessiz Ev
 1990 Independent Foreign Fiction Prize (United Kingdom) for his novel Beyaz Kale
 1991 Prix de la Découverte Européenne (France) for the French edition of Sessiz Ev : La Maison de Silence
 1991 Antalya Golden Orange Film Festival (Turkey) Best Original Screenplay Gizli Yüz
 1995 Prix France Culture (France) for his novel Kara Kitap: Le Livre Noir
 2002 Prix du Meilleur Livre Etranger (France) for his novel My Name Is Red: Mon Nom est Rouge
 2002 Premio Grinzane Cavour (Italy) for his novel My Name Is Red
 2003 International Dublin Literary Award (Ireland) for his novel My Name Is Red (awarded jointly with translator Erdağ M. Göknar)
 2005 Peace Prize of the German Book Trade (Germany)
 2005 Prix Médicis étranger (France) for his novel Snow: La Neige
 2006 Nobel Prize in Literature (Sweden)
 2006 Washington University in St. Louis's Distinguished Humanist Award (United States)
 2006  Ordre des Arts et des Lettres (France)
 2008 Ovidius Prize (Romania)
 2010 Norman Mailer Prize, Lifetime Achievement (USA)
 2012 Sonning Prize (Denmark)
 2012  Légion d'honneur Officier (France)
 2014 The Mary Lynn Kotz Award (USA) for his book "The Innocence of Objects"
 2014 Tabernakul Prize (Macedonia)
 2014 European Museum of the Year Award (Estonia)
 2014 Helena Vaz da Silva European Award for Public Awareness on Cultural Heritage (Portugal) 
 2015 Erdal Öz Prize (Turkey), for his novel A Strangeness in My Mind
 2015 Aydın Doğan Foundation Award (Turkey), for his novel A Strangeness in My Mind
 2016 The Yasnaya Polyana Literary Award ("Foreign Literature" category, Russia) for his novel A Strangeness in My Mind
 2016 Milovan Vidaković Prize in Novi Sad (Serbia)
 2017 Budapest Grand Prize (Hungary)
 2017 Literary Flame Prize (Montenegro)
 2019 Golden Plate Award of the American Academy of Achievement

Doctorates, honoris causa 
 2007 Free University of Berlin, Department of Philosophy and Humanities – 4 May 2007
 2007 Tilburg University – 15 November 2007
 2007 Boğaziçi University, Department of Turkish Language and Literature – 14 May 2007
 2007 Georgetown University's Honorary Degree: Doctor of Humane Letters honoris causa
 2007 Complutense University of Madrid
 2008 University of Florence
 2008 American University of Beirut
 2009 University of Rouen
 2010 University of Tirana
 2010 Yale University
 2011 Sofia University
 2017 Brera Academy (Italia)
 2017 St. Petersburg State University
2018 University of Crete

Honours 
 2005 Honorary Member of American Academy of Arts and Letters (USA)
 2008 Honorary Member of Social Sciences of Chinese Academy (China)
 2008 Honorary Member of American Academy of Arts and Sciences (USA)

In 2005, Pamuk received the €25,000 Peace Prize of the German Book Trade for his literary work, in which "Europe and Islamic Turkey find a place for one another." The award presentation was held at Paul's Church, Frankfurt.

Bibliography

Novels (English)
 The White Castle, translated by Victoria Holbrook, Manchester (UK): Carcanet Press Limited, 1990; 1991; New York: George Braziller, 1991 [original title: Beyaz Kale]
 The Black Book, translated by Güneli Gün, New York: Farrar, Straus & Giroux, 1994 [original title: Kara Kitap]. (A new translation by Maureen Freely was published in 2006)
 The New Life, translated by Güneli Gün, New York: Farrar, Straus & Giroux, 1997 [original title: Yeni Hayat]
 My Name Is Red, translated by Erdağ M. Göknar, New York: Alfred A. Knopf, 2001 [original title: Benim Adım Kırmızı].
 Snow, translated by Maureen Freely, New York: Alfred A. Knopf, 2004 [original title: Kar]
 The Museum of Innocence, translated by Maureen Freely, New York: Alfred A. Knopf, was released on 20 October 2009 [original title: Masumiyet Müzesi]
 Silent House, translated by Robert Finn, New York:  Alfred A. Knopf, 2012 [original title: Sessiz Ev]
 A Strangeness in My Mind, translated by Ekin Oklap, New York:  Alfred A. Knopf, 2015 [original title: Kafamda Bir Tuhaflık]
 The Red-Haired Woman, translated by Ekin Oklap, New York:  Alfred A. Knopf, 2017 [original title: Kırmızı saçlı kadın]
 Nights of Plague, translated by Ekin Oklap, London: Faber & Faber, 2022 [original title: Veba Geceleri]

Non-fiction (English)
 Istanbul: Memories and the City, translated by Maureen Freely, New York: Alfred A. Knopf, 2005 [original title: İstanbul: Hatıralar ve Şehir]
 My Father’s Suitcase [original title: Babamın Bavulu] Nobel lecture
 Other Colors: Essays and a Story, translated by Maureen Freely, New York: Alfred A. Knopf, 2007 [original title: Öteki Renkler]
 The Innocence of Objects [original title: Şeylerin Masumiyeti]
 The Naive and Sentimental Novelist, Harvard University Press, 2010
 Balkon, Steidl Publisher, 2018
 Orange, Steidl Publisher, 2020

Turkish

Novels
 Cevdet Bey ve Oğulları (Cevdet Bey and His Sons), novel, Istanbul: Karacan Yayınları, 1982
 Sessiz Ev (Silent House), novel, Istanbul: Can Yayınları, 1983
 Beyaz Kale (The White Castle), novel, Istanbul: Can Yayınları, 1985
 Kara Kitap (The Black Book), novel, Istanbul: Can Yayınları, 1990
 Yeni Hayat (The New Life), novel, Istanbul: İletişim Yayınları, 1994
 Benim Adım Kırmızı (My Name is Red), novel, Istanbul: İletişim Yayınları, 1998
 Kar (Snow), novel, Istanbul: İletişim Yayınları, 2002
 Masumiyet Müzesi (The Museum of Innocence), novel, Istanbul: İletişim Yayınları, 2008
 Kafamda Bir Tuhaflık (A Strangeness in My Mind), novel, Istanbul:  Yapı Kredi Publications, 2014
 Kırmızı Saçlı Kadın, (The Red-Haired Woman), novel, Yapı Kredi Yayınları, 2016
 Veba Geceleri (tr,): "Nights of Plague" (2021)
Fathers, Mothers and Sons : Cevdet Bey and Sons; The Silent House; The Red-Haired Woman ("Delta" Omnibüs, Novels volume I), Yapı Kredi Yayınları, 2018

Other Works
 Gizli Yüz (Secret Face), screenplay, Istanbul: Can Yayınları, 1992
 Öteki Renkler (Other Colours), essays, Istanbul: İletişim Yayınları, 1999
 İstanbul: Hatıralar ve Şehir (Istanbul: Memories and the City), memoirs, Istanbul: Yapı Kredi Yayınları, 2003
 Babamın Bavulu (My Father's Suitcase), Nobel Söylevi, İstanbul, İletişim Yayınları, 2007
 Manzaradan Parçalar: Hayat, Sokaklar, Edebiyat (Pieces from the View: Life, Streets, Literature), essays, Istanbul: İletişim Yayınları, 2010
 Saf ve Düşünceli Romancı ("Naive and Sentimental Novelist") literary criticism, İstanbul: İletişim Yayınları, 2011
 Şeylerin Masumiyeti (The Innocence of Objects), Masumiyet Müzesi Kataloğu, İletişim Yayınları 2012
 Resimli İstanbul - Hatıralar ve Şehir, memoir, Yapı Kredi Yayınları, 2015
 Hatıraların Masumiyeti, scripts and essays, Yapı Kredi Yayınları, 2016
Balkon, (Introduction and photographs), Yapı Kredi Yayınları, 2018
Orange, (Introduction and Photographs), Yapi Kredi Yayınları, 192 pages, 350 images, 2020

References

External links

 The comprehensive website on Orhan Pamuk 
 
 Orhan Pamuk at Nobelprize.org  - prize announcement
List of Works
 Orhan Pamuk at The New York Review of Books (article archive) 
 Documentary about Pamuk and The Armenian Genocide at the ABC
 
 Urdu Translations of Orhan Pamuk's books, Jumhoori Publications
 List of Published Books

Interviews
  

1952 births
Living people
Bard College faculty
Best Screenplay Golden Orange Award winners
Freedom of expression in Turkey
Columbia University faculty
Istanbul University alumni
Nobel laureates in Literature
Writers from Istanbul
Postmodern writers
Prix Médicis étranger winners
Robert College alumni
Turkish essayists
Turkish historical novelists
Turkish people of Circassian descent
Turkish memoirists
Turkish Nobel laureates
Turkish non-fiction writers
Turkish novelists
Turkish male screenwriters
20th-century novelists
21st-century novelists
International Writing Program alumni
20th-century essayists
21st-century essayists
Members of the American Philosophical Society
Cultural Muslims